The Norwegian Boundary Sediment Plain is a Marine Protected Area (MPA) lying to the northeast of Scotland.
lies at the very edge of Scottish offshore waters, close to the maritime boundary with Norway. The seabed of the sediment plain consists of sand and gravel habitats, and lies at a depth of between 80 and 120 metres below sea level. The sea bed supports creatures such as starfish, crabs and ocean quahogs. The latter, which are large and slow growing clams, have a lifespan of more than 400 years and are thus considered to be amongst the oldest living animals on Earth.

References

External links
Site Summary Leaflet - Joint Nature Conservation Committee

Nature Conservation Marine Protected Areas of Scotland
North Sea